= Marching Song of the 318th Eng'rs =

"Marching Song of the 318th Eng’rs"
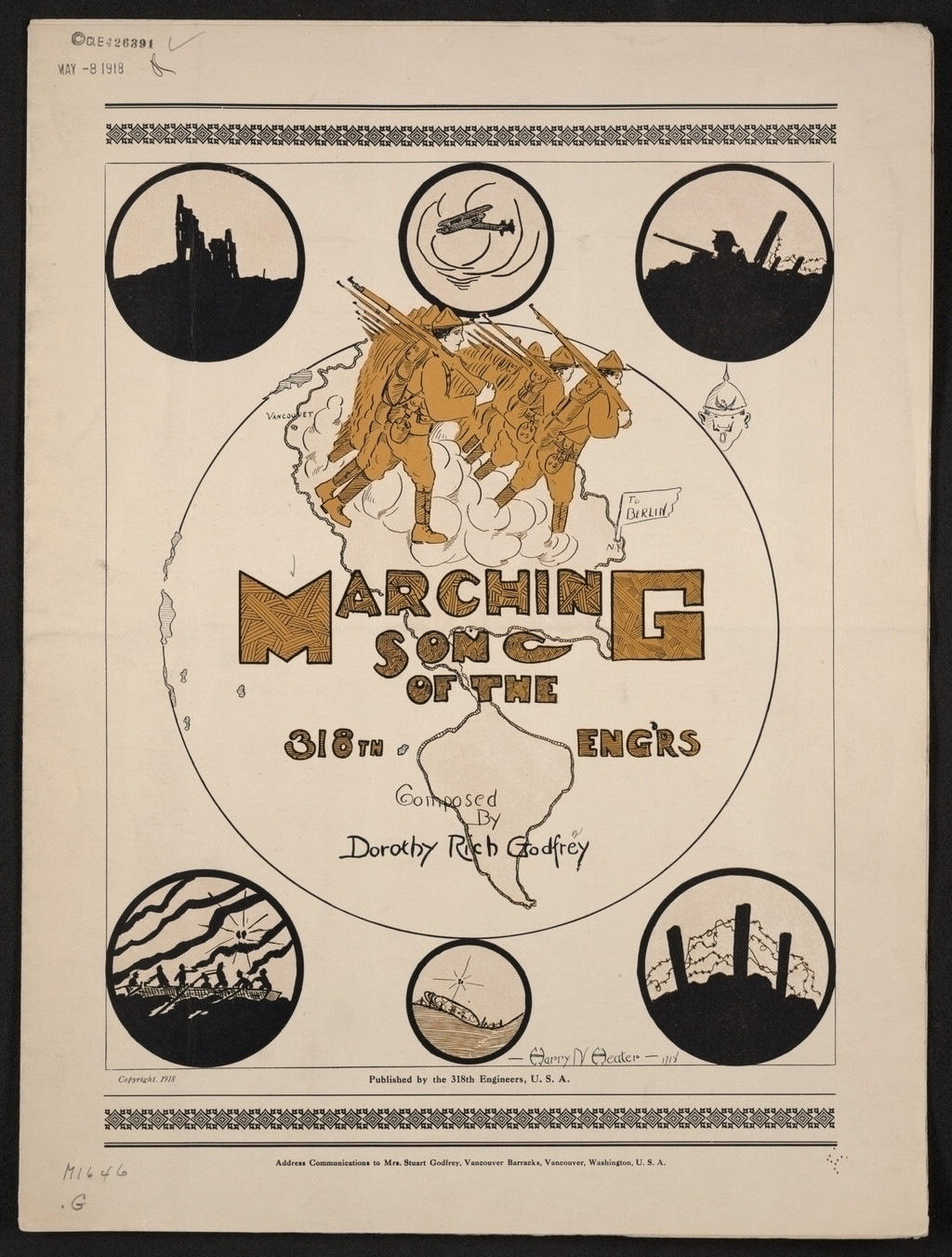

Song
- Published: 1918
- Songwriter(s): Dorothy Rich Godfrey

Marching Song of the 318th Eng’rs is a song by Dorothy Rich Godfrey from 1918 and was published by the 318th Engineers.
